Gregory Bernard Hoversten (born June 10, 1957) is an American politician in the state of Iowa.

Hoversten attended University of Osteopathic Medicine and Health Sciences as well as the University of Iowa. He is a family physician. A Republican, he served in the Iowa House of Representatives from 2001 to 2003 (1st district)

References

1957 births
Living people
Physicians from Iowa
Republican Party members of the Iowa House of Representatives